The Red Tent or Red Tent may refer to:
 Red Tent (shelter), a tent used by survivors of the airship Italia
The Red Tent (Nagibin novel), 1960
The Red Tent (film), a 1969 Russian-Italian film based on Nagibin's novel
The Red Tent (Diamant novel), 1997
The Red Tent (miniseries), a 2014 miniseries based on Diamant's novel